Glenbrook is a former settlement in Nevada County, California, located near Grass Valley. It was listed on an official map as of 1949.

History
In the late 1800s, the Shelton College and Nevada County Academy were located at Glenbrook.

In 1887, Glenbrook became notable for the Glenbrook Park and Racetrack where the first outdoor sports event was lit by electricity.

References

Former settlements in Nevada County, California
Former populated places in California